Assassin's Creed: The Fall is an American comic book three-issue mini-series published by WildStorm from November 2010 to January 2011. Set in the Assassin's Creed universe, it tells the story of Nikolai Orelov, a member of the Russian Brotherhood of Assassins, who fights Templar influence in Russia in the late 1880s and early 20th-century. The miniseries also features a framing story, set in 1998, which follows Nikolai's descendant Daniel Cross as he explores his ancestor's genetic memories while trying to learn more about his own past and the history of the Assassins.

Written and created by Cameron Stewart and Karl Kerschl, the new comic book series was initially going to be an expansion of the travels of Ezio Auditore da Firenze, but was moved to an entirely new setting to provide greater freedom to the writers. However, the story still follows the feud between the Templars and the Assassins, with the latter being connected to the Narodnaya Volya.

A graphic novel sequel, titled Assassin's Creed: The Chain, was published by UbiWorkshop in August 2012. A video game set in-between the events of The Fall and The Chain, Assassin's Creed Chronicles: Russia, was released in February 2016.

Plot synopsis
The first issue of the comic was released on November 10, 2010, a few days before the retail debut of Assassin's Creed: Brotherhood. Its story follows Nikolai as he battles the Templars over a powerful artifact and it culminates with a final battle with Tsar Alexander III aboard a speeding train, resulting in the Borki train disaster. The second issue, released on December 1, continues as Nikolai prepares an attack on a Templar research station in Siberia. His mission eventually leads to the Tunguska event. Meanwhile, in 1998, Daniel Cross is trying to find more information about his past and the modern Assassins Order. The final issue, released on January 12, 2011, begins with the Bolsheviks taking control of the country. Nikolai confronts Tsar Nicholas II to acquire information about the artifact's location. In 1998, Daniel meets with the Mentor of the Assassins Order before it is revealed that Daniel is actually a sleeper agent brainwashed at age 7 to kill the Mentor when the opportunity presents itself, as well as a former test subject of Abstergo Industries' Animus experiments: Subject 4.

Collected editions
The comics have been collected into a trade paperback:

Assassins Creed: The Fall (128 pages, Panini Comics, Italian language edition, January 2011, Titan Books, November 2013)
The Fall Deluxe Edition was a softcover special edition that brought all three issues of The Fall, plus an exclusive 10-page epilogue, which would also act as transition towards the next comic saga, Assassin's Creed: The Chain. This edition had a total of 128 pages, including the exclusive epilogue and a making-of section.

Both The Fall and The Chain were collected in Assassin's Creed: Subject Four, a 208-page trade paperback that was include in Assassin’s Creed 3: The Ubiworkshop Edition, along with Assassin's Creed: Encyclopedia.

Notes

References

2010 comics debuts
WildStorm limited series
Comics based on Assassin's Creed

it:Assassin's Creed (serie)#Assassin's Creed: The Fall